Laplace Island is a small rocky island  west-northwest of La Conchée and  north of Cape Mousse, Antarctica. It was charted in 1951 by the French Antarctic Expedition and named by them for Pierre-Simon Laplace, the French astronomer and mathematician.

See also 
 List of Antarctic and sub-Antarctic islands
 Laplace Island (disambiguation)

References

Islands of Adélie Land